Bolshetroitskoye is a rural locality (a selo) and the administrative center of Bolshetroitskoye Rural Settlement, Shebekinsky District, Belgorod Oblast, Russia. The population was 2,250 as of 2010. There are 27 streets.

Geography 
Bolshetroitskoye is located 42 km northeast of Shebekino (the district's administrative centre) by road. Chervona Dibrovka is the nearest rural locality.

References 

Rural localities in Shebekinsky District
Novooskolsky Uyezd